Rochelle Riley is the Director of Arts and Culture for the City of Detroit. She formerly was a nationally syndicated columnist for the Detroit Free Press in Detroit, Michigan, United States. She was an advocate in her column for improved race relations, literacy, community building, and children.

Personal
Rochelle Riley grew up in Tarboro, North Carolina. She was raised in part by her grandfather Willie Bennie Pitt and grandmother Lowney Hilliard Pitt. She said in her acceptance speech at the Ida B. Wells Award that her grandmother's curiosity influenced her own curiosity about current events and their impact on our lives. She has one daughter. Rochelle attended the University of North Carolina at Chapel Hill, where she majored in journalism and English. In 2008, she completed a Knight-Wallace Fellowship at the University of Michigan.

Career
Rochelle Riley has appeared on NPR, MSNBC, CNN and FOX2. She has worked as an editor or reporter at The Washington Post, The Dallas Morning News, the Dallas Times Herald and The (Louisville) Courier-Journal. In Louisville, she was deputy managing editor, 1992–96, associate editor and columnist, 1996–2000; and from 2000 to 2019, she was a Detroit Free Press columnist. In 1985, when she was with The Dallas  Morning News, she founded the DFW/ABC Urban Journalism Workshop to train minority youth to be journalists.

Notable works of journalism
Her columns about former Detroit Mayor Kwame Kilpatrick were a part of the entry that won the 2009 Pulitzer Prize in local reporting.  She is also notable for her excellence in journalism and for mentoring future journalists to ensure that newsrooms reflect the diversity of their communities, which is why she won the Ida B. Wells Award from the National Association of Black Journalists and Northwestern University. She also is known for advocating for press freedom as a member of the International Press Institute and the NABJ Global Journalism Task Force. She has spent years crusading for better lives for children, government accountability, improved race relations and increased adult literacy, by helping to raise  nearly $2 million for literacy causes in Michigan.

Context
Riley was known as one of the top African-American journalists in the United States; she has received several awards for her nationally syndicated columns. When she was named deputy managing editor of The Courier-Journal in Louisville in 1992, she was the paper's first African-American news executive.

Bibliography
That They Lived: African Americans Who Changed The World  (Wayne State University Press, 2021)
The Burden: African Americans and the Enduring Impact of Slavery  (Wayne State University Press, 2018)

Awards
 2021 Inductee, National Association of Black Journalists Hall of Fame
 2019 Inductee, N.C. Media and Journalism Hall of Fame
 2019 National Headliner Award
 2017, NABJ Ida B. Wells Award
 2017, Pulliam Editorial Fellowship
 2016, Inductee Michigan Journalism Hall of Fame
 2013, National Headliner Award
 2011, National Scripps Howard Award
 2011, Will Rogers Humanitarian Award, National Society of Newspaper Columnists.
 2010, Harvey Beech Distinguished Alumni Award from the University of North Carolina Alumni Association BAR Committee
 2009, Pulitzer Prize for local reporting
 2004, National Journalism Award for Distinguished Service to Literacy Scripps Howard Foundation

See also
National Association of Black Journalists

References

External links 
 National Association of Black Journalists

1959 births
Living people
African-American journalists
African-American women journalists
American women journalists
Journalists from North Carolina
21st-century African-American people
21st-century African-American women
20th-century African-American people
20th-century African-American women